Gowjeh Qia (also Romanized as Gowjeh Qīā, Gowjeh Qīyā, Gaujeh Qiya, and Gowjeh Qayā; also known as Gogjeh Ghiya, Gowgjaqayā, Gowgjeh Qayeh, Gowgjeh Qīeh, Gowjeh Qayeh, and Goyudzha-Kaya) is a village in Mojezat Rural District, in the Central District of Zanjan County, Zanjan Province, Iran. At the 2006 census, its population was 544, in 125 families.

References 

Populated places in Zanjan County